The Sendai International Music Competition is a triennial violin and piano music competition held in Sendai, Japan, presented in association with the Sendai International Music Competition Organizing Committee, City of Sendai and the Sendai Cultural Foundation. In the competition there is no overall winner, rather there are six winners each from the violin and piano categories, with the first-placed winners receiving the highest prize. Although the competition is international, most award-winners have been from either Europe or Asia. The first award-winner from outside those continents was American Sean Kennard, who finished fifth in the 2004 competition's piano category.

History
The Sendai International Music Competition is held every three years. at the Sendai City Youth Cultural Centre in Japan. It has the stated purpose of "contributing to the development of world musical culture and the promotion of international cultural exchange through the discovery of young talented musicians". It was established in 2001 to commemorate Sendai City's 400th anniversary, and has been a member of the World Federation of International Music Competitions (WFIMC) since 2005.  Five competitions have been held, the most recent being in 2013, with the next scheduled to take place on 21 May to 26 June 2016.

Format
The competition consists of four stages: a pre-selection round, followed by a preliminary round, and then the semi-final and the final rounds in which all pieces are performed with an orchestra. The competition is split into two categories: violin and piano. The number of contestants who progress from the preliminary round to the semi-finals cannot exceed 12 and the contestants passing through to the final cannot exceed six. In the preliminary, semi-final, and final stages of the competition the performances are chosen from a predetermined repertoire; the contestants must choose a different piece for each round. The judging panel decides the placing of the prizewinners from first through sixth. The prize money is as follows:

Winners
The first competition was held in 2001. Chinese Mengla Huang and Bulgarian Svetlin Roussev topped the violin category and the Italian Giuseppe Andaloro took first prize in the piano section. In the second tournament in 2004, Japanese Saeka Matsuyama won the violin part in the final and Xiaotang Tan from China came in first place in the piano category. In the 2007 finals, which contained five Russian contestants, the violin section was topped by Russian Alena Baeva while in the piano category the Japanese Yuya Tsuda came first. The 2010 violin competition was won by the German/South Korean Clara-Jumi Kang, while Vadym Kholodenko of Ukraine won the piano competition. As of 2013 there have been five competitions.

2001

2004

2007

2010

2013

2016

2019

2022

References

General

2001 Violin Prize-Winners. Sendai International Music Competition. Retrieved on 22 May 2008.
2001 Piano Prize-Winners. Sendai International Music Competition. Retrieved on 22 May 2008.
2004 Violin Prize-Winners. Sendai International Music Competition. Retrieved on 22 May 2008.
2004 Piano Prize-Winners. Sendai International Music Competition. Retrieved on 22 May 2008.
2007 Prize-Winners. Sendai International Music Competition. Retrieved on 22 May 2008.

Specific

External links
Official website